MacGyver is an American action-adventure television series created by Lee David Zlotoff. Henry Winkler and John Rich were the executive producers. The show ran for seven seasons on ABC in the United States and various other networks abroad from 1985 to 1992.

BMI Film & TV Award

Emmy Awards

Genesis Awards

TV Land Award
MacGyver has been nominated for 2 TV Land Awards.

Young Artist Awards

References

External links
 Awards for MacGyver at IMDB

MacGyver
Awards and nominations